Bayazitovo (Bayazit) is a rural locality (a selo) in Satyyevsky Selsoviet, Miyakinsky District, Bashkortostan, Russia. The population was 640 as of 2010. There are 12 streets.

Geography 
Bayazitovo is located 24 km south of Kirgiz-Miyaki (the district's administrative centre) by road. Satyevo is the nearest rural locality.

References 

Rural localities in Miyakinsky District